Georg Dahlfelt (12 April 1919 – 12 January 2007) was a Danish footballer. He played in four matches for the Denmark national football team in 1950.

References

External links
 

1919 births
2007 deaths
Danish men's footballers
Denmark international footballers
Footballers from Odense
Association football midfielders
Akademisk Boldklub players